Ben Downing may refer to:

Ben Downing (writer) (born 1967), American author
Benjamin Downing (born 1981), known as Ben, American politician